Rocky Mount is an unincorporated community in eastern Morgan County, Missouri, United States. It is located six miles southwest of Eldon, near the Lake of the Ozarks.  The ZIP Code for Rocky Mount is 65072.

History
A post office called Rocky Mount was established in 1919 and remained in operation until 1973. The community was most likely so named on account of the local terrain.

References

Unincorporated communities in Morgan County, Missouri
Unincorporated communities in Missouri